We Never Sleep may refer to:

"We never sleep", motto of the Pinkertons
"We never sleep", motto of the Ancient Mystic Order of Samaritans
We Never Sleep (film), a 1917 American short comedy film
"We Never Sleep", a 1988 song by Boredoms on the album Osorezan no Stooges Kyo
"We Never Sleep", a 2015 song by Gavin Becker
We Never Sleep, a 2006 LP by Drop the Lime